Arthur Knowles (10 April 1858 – 10 July 1929) was an English industrialist and cricketer active from 1888 to 1896 who played for Lancashire. He was born in Manchester and died in Cheshire. He appeared in five first-class matches as a righthanded batsman, scoring 83 runs with a highest score of 16 and held two catches. On 26 March 1902, he was appointed a deputy lieutenant of Lancashire. In 1896 he opened Alvaston Hall

Notes

1858 births
1929 deaths
Deputy Lieutenants of Lancashire
English cricketers
Lancashire cricketers
Marylebone Cricket Club cricketers
People educated at Rugby School